Pelleas , or Pellias, is an Arthurian Knight of the Round Table whose story first appears in the Post-Vulgate Cycle. He becomes the husband of Nimue, the Lady of the Lake in Le Morte d'Arthur. His character might have been connected to the figure of Pwyll, the fairy Rhiannon's human husband  in Welsh mythology.

In the Post-Vulgate, Pellias, the son of a poor vavasour, seeks the love of the high-born maiden, named Arcade or Archade. Though he wins her a golden circlet in a tournament, she spurns him, holes up in her castle refusing to see him, and sends her knights daily to humiliate him in hopes of driving him away. During the course of unrelated adventures, Gawain, Arthur's nephew, witnesses Pellias's humiliation and vows to help him by going to Arcade wearing Pellias' armour so that it appears that Pellias killed Gawain. Once in her confidences, Gawain plans to woo Arcade on behalf of Pellias, delivering her to him. Instead, Gawain falls for Arcade himself, his passion causing him to forget his promise to Pellias. When Gawain does not return with the maiden, Pellias seeks them out and finds them in bed together. Though distraught, Pellias cannot bring himself to kill them, so leaves his bare sword between them in the bed and returns home, where he says he will never leave his bed until he dies from grief. The next morning, Arcade recognises the sword and Gawain remembers his promise. He convinces Arcade to love Pellias and arranges for them to meet. The pair marry and have a son, Guivret the Younger, who later becomes one of Arthur's knights. 

Thomas Malory reworked the Post-Vulgate story in the first book of his seminal compilation Le Morte d'Arthur. There, Gawain leaves the maiden—who in this version is called Ettarde—after the incident with the sword. Nimue, one of the Ladies of the Lake, comes upon Pelleas, hears his story, and falls in love with him herself. She takes vengeance on Ettarde by magic, enchanting her to fall in love with Pelleas as deeply as he loved her. Pelleas, whose love has turned to hate, spurns Ettarde, and she dies of sorrow. Nimue and Pelleas fall in love and marry.

Pelleas also appears as a minor character at other points in both of these works. He is active fighting in tournaments and defending Guinevere from her abductor Maleagant as one of the Queen's Knights. 

In Tennyson's Idylls of the King, Pelleas is knighted by Arthur at a young age. As a young knight, he deeply loves the maiden named Ettarre who finds his youthful shyness and stammering bothersome and does not return his affection. She lies to him to induce him to give her a golden arm circlet, the prize of a tournament that he won, as a token of his love. Ettarre, selfish and having gained the circlet and thus some social elevation, desires to be left alone; but despite her treachery Pelleas cannot forget her. He defeats all knights sent by her but, after each victory, deliberately allows himself to be captured and taken prisoner to her castle, as it is the only way that he can ever see his true love. Unsympathetic, Ettarre takes his horse from him and sends him on his way, only to return again and again. Gawain offers to try to persuade Ettarre to love Pelleas. Gawain instead lies to her, telling her he has slain Pelleas, and betrays him, sleeping with her himself. Pelleas finds the two together sleeping, and leaves his sword on their chests, revealing that he is alive and well, but also as a sign of honour, as he says he cannot kill a knight such as Gawain in his sleep.

References

External links
Pelleas and Ettarde at The Camelot Project

Arthurian characters
Knights of the Round Table